Ma Yujun (born 15 February 2003) is a Chinese footballer currently playing as a midfielder for Beijing Guoan.

Club career
Ma Yujun was promoted to the senior team of Beijing Guoan within the 2020 Chinese Super League season. He would make his debut in a Chinese FA Cup game on 28 November 2020 against Chengdu Better City in a 1-0 victory. He would be given an opportunity to participate within senior games when he was part of the AFC Champions League squad, which was a mix of reserves and youth players to participate within centralized venues while the clubs senior players were still dealing with self-isolating measures due to COVID-19. He would make his continental debut in a AFC Champions League game on 26 June 2021 against United City F.C. in a 1-1 draw.

Career statistics
.

References

External links

2003 births
Living people
Chinese footballers
Association football midfielders
Beijing Guoan F.C. players